Sutherland is a Scottish surname which may refer to:

People 
 Alexander Sutherland (disambiguation), multiple people
 Andrae Hugh Sutherland, Jamaican singer
 Anne Bryson Sutherland (1922–2011), Scottish plastic surgeon
 Anne Sutherland-Leveson-Gower, Duchess of Sutherland (1829–1888)
 Arthur E. Sutherland, New York state Supreme Court judge (1862–1949)
 Arthur E. Sutherland, Jr., Harvard Law School professor and legal scholar (1902–1973)
 Alyssa Sutherland (born 1982), Australian model & actress
 Angus Sutherland (born 1982), American-Canadian actor and producer
 Bert Sutherland (1936–2020), American IT researcher
 Bruce Sutherland (1926–2010), American pianist, music educator and composer
 Catherine Sutherland (born 1974), Australian actress
Charles W. Sutherland (1860–1943), American newspaper editor and politician
 Craig Sutherland (born 1988), Scottish footballer
 Cromartie Sutherland-Leveson-Gower, 4th Duke of Sutherland (1851–1913), British politician
 Daniel Sutherland (1869–1955), American businessperson and politician
 Darren Sutherland (1982–2009), Irish boxer
 David Sutherland (disambiguation), multiple people
 Donald Sutherland (1843/1844–1919), British soldier and explorer of New Zealand
 Donald Sutherland (born 1935), Canadian actor
 Doug Sutherland (disambiguation), multiple people
 Douglas Sutherland (1919–1995), British author and journalist
 Earl Wilbur Sutherland Jr. (1915–1974), American physiologist and Nobel laureate
 Edmund G. Sutherland (1815–1883), New York politician
 Edwin Sutherland (1883–1950), American sociologist
 Efua Sutherland (1924–1996), Ghanaian playwright
 Eileen Sutherland-Leveson-Gower, Duchess of Sutherland (1891–1943), British courtier
 Esther Sutherland, American actress
 Euan Sutherland,  Scottish businessman, CEO of the Co-operative Group
 Fern Sutherland, New Zealand actress
 Gary Sutherland (born 1944), American baseball player
 Gavin Sutherland (disambiguation), multiple people
 Gavin & Iain Sutherland, the Sutherland Brothers, British folk and rock music duo
 George Sutherland (disambiguation), multiple people
 Sir Gordon Sutherland (1907–1980), Scottish physicist
 Graham Sutherland (1903–1980), English artist
 Hal Sutherland (1929–2014), American animator and painter
 Harriet Sutherland-Leveson-Gower, Duchess of Sutherland (1806–1868), British courtier and philanthropist
 Howard Sutherland (1865–1950), American politician
 Humphrey Sutherland (1908–1986), English numismatist
 Iain Sutherland (disambiguation) or Ian Sutherland, several persons
 Ivan Sutherland (born 1938), American computer scientist and Internet pioneer
 Jabez G. Sutherland (1825–1902), U.S. Representative from Michigan
 James Sutherland (disambiguation), multiple people
 Jeff Sutherland, American software developer
 Dame Joan Sutherland (1926–2010), Australian opera singer
 Jock Sutherland (1889–1948), American football player and coach
 Joel Sutherland (disambiguation), multiple people
 John Sutherland (disambiguation), multiple people
 Josiah Sutherland (1804–1887), New York lawyer and politician
 Keaton Sutherland (born 1997), American football player
 Kenneth F. Sutherland (1888–1954), New York politician
 Kev F. Sutherland (born 1961), Scottish comedian and comic strip creator
 Kevin Sutherland (born 1964), American professional golfer
 Kiefer Sutherland (born 1966), Canadian actor
 Kimble Sutherland (born 1966), Canadian politician
 Kristine Sutherland (born 1955), American actress
 Larry Sutherland (1951–2005), New Zealand politician
 Dame Lucy Sutherland (1903–1980), British historian and university college head
 Luke Sutherland (born 1971), Scottish novelist and musician
 Margaret Sutherland (1897–1984), Australian composer
 Matthew R. Sutherland (1894–unknown), Canadian politician
 Max Sutherland (ice hockey) (1904–1984), Canadian ice hockey player
 Michael Sutherland (born 1954), Australian politician
 Nadine Sutherland (born 1968), Jamaican singer
 Neil Sutherland (1942–1998), Australian rules footballer
 Peter Sutherland (1946–2018), Irish politician
 Peter A. Sutherland (1933-1994), US Diplomat
 Rachel Sutherland  (born 1976), New Zealand field hockey player
 Ranald Sutherland, Lord Sutherland (born 1932), Scottish judge
 Richard Sutherland (disambiguation), multiple people
 Robert Sutherland (1830–1878), Jamaican-Canadian lawyer
 Robert Franklin Sutherland (1859–1922), Canadian politician
 Roderick Dhu Sutherland (1862–1915), American lawyer and politician
 Rosamund Sutherland (1947–2019), British mathematics educator
 Rupert Sutherland (born 1967), New Zealand geologist
Sabrina S. Sutherland, American producer
 Seven Sutherland Sisters, famous American family that toured the US, known for very long hair
 Sonita Sutherland, Jamaican runner
 Solomon Sutherland (1762–1802), New York politician
 Stella Sutherland (1924–2015), Shetland writer
 Steve Sutherland (DJ) (died 2020), British DJ
 Stewart Sutherland, Baron Sutherland of Houndwood (1941–2018), Scottish public servant and philosopher of religion
 Struan Sutherland (1936–2002), Australian toxicologist
 Stuart Sutherland (1927–1998), British psychologist
 Sylvia Sutherland, Canadian politician
 Thomas Sutherland (disambiguation), multiple people
 Trevor Sutherland, Jamaican musician
 Trevor Sutherland, New Zealand cricketer
 Tui T. Sutherland, Venezuelan-American children's author
 Victor Sutherland (1889–1968), American stage, film, and television actor
 Walter Sutherland (1890–1918), Scottish rugby union footballer
 William Sutherland (disambiguation), multiple people
 Zena Sutherland (1915–2002), American children's literature critic and author

Fictional characters
 William Sutherland, a fictional character in the anime Gundam SEED
 Beth Sutherland in Australian soap opera Home and Away
Beth Sutherland in British soap opera Coronation Street
 Dani Sutherland in Australian soap opera Home and Away
 Katie Sutherland in British sitcom The Inbetweeners
 Kevin Sutherland in British sitcom The Inbetweeners
 Kirk Sutherland in British soap opera Coronation Street
 Max Sutherland in Australian soap opera Home and Away
 Maria Sutherland in British soap opera Coronation Street
 Neil Sutherland in British sitcom The Inbetweeners
 Rhys Sutherland in British soap opera Coronation Street
 Victoria Sutherland, vampire in American film series The Twilight Saga

Scottish toponymic surnames
English-language surnames